Hyles salangensis, the Salang hawkmoth, is a moth of the family Sphingidae. The species was first described by G. Ebert in 1969. It is only known from the Salang Pass and surrounding mountains in Afghanistan.

The wingspan is 55–70 mm. Adults are on wing in early July.

References

External links
 

Hyles (moth)
Moths described in 1969